The National Watercolor Society is a non-profit society which is headed by artists. Its main goal is to improve watercolor painting through trainings and exhibitions.

History
The National Watercolor Society was established by Dana Bartlett in 1920, who was its first president, as the California Water Color Society. In 1967, the members of the society decided to rename the society as the California National Watercolor Society. In 1975, the society was renamed as the National Watercolor Society.

The National Watercolor Society held its first exhibition in the Los Angeles County Museum of Art. The society used the museum to hold annual exhibitions for 25 years.

In 1999, the foundation of the new building for the National Watercolor Society was laid. The building was financed with the support of the members of the society. The opening ceremony of the building was held in 2010.

See also
 American Watercolor Society
 New England Watercolor Society

References

External links 

 California Water Color Society. Collection guide, California State Library, California History Room.

American artist groups and collectives
Arts organizations based in California
Arts organizations established in 1920
Watercolor societies